is a Japanese idol and tarento. She is a first generation member of the Japanese girl group NGT48. She is represented with Ohta Production.

Life and career
Growing up in Toyama, Nakai had aspirations to become famous since she was in elementary school. With influences from AKB48 while she was young, she entered and passed the NGT48 audition for 1st generation members in 2015 during her 3rd year of high school.

In 2016, she was placed in Team NIII with 15 other members and performed at the NGT48 Theater grand opening. In 2017 she signed up to Ohta Production from her previous agency AKS, and had been appearing on various television programs afterwards, even performing in a dedicated one-day solo concert in 2018. She is currently active in both her idol activities and her career as a tarento and assistant MC.

Media

Television

Variety shows
  (Fuji TV, October 2017–March 2019)
  (TV Asahi, October 2017–December 2018) - Assistant MC
  (TV Tokyo, April 2018–March 2020) - Assistant MC
  (TV Asahi, February 2019–September 2020) - MC
  (Fuji TV, April 2019–March 2020) - MC alongside Kazutoyo Koyabu

References

External links
 
 Ohta Productions - Official Profile

Living people
1997 births
Japanese idols
Japanese women singers
NGT48 members
People from Toyama (city)